December 22 - Eastern Orthodox liturgical calendar - December 24

All fixed commemorations below celebrated on January 5 by Eastern Orthodox Churches on the Old Calendar.

For December 23rd, Orthodox Churches on the Old Calendar commemorate the Saints listed on December 10.

Feasts
 Forefeast of the Nativity of Christ.

Saints
 Holy Ten Martyrs of Crete (250):
 Theodulus, Saturninus, Euporus, Gelasius, Eunician, Zoticus, Pompeius, Agathopus, Basilides, and Evaristus.
 Martyr Schinon (Skinus), by the sword.
 Saint Paul, Bishop of Neo-Caesarea, a father of the First Ecumenical Council (4th century)
 Saint Niphon, Bishop of Constantia on Cyprus (4th century)
 Saint Chrysogonos (Chrysogonus).
 Venerable David of Echmiadzin in Armenia (693)
 Saint Naum of Ochrid, Enlightener of Bulgaria (910) (see also May 11 - Greek; and July 27 - Slavic)

Pre-Schism Western saints
 Virgin-Martyrs Victoria and Anatolia, two sisters martyred in Rome for refusing to marry pagans (250)
 Martyrs Migdonius and Mardonius, high officials at the imperial court in Rome, under Diocletian (303)
 Saint Servulus, a righteous man who was a cripple, used to beg for alms at the door of the church of St Clement in Rome, sharing what he received with other beggars (c. 590)
 Saint Dagobert II, King of Austrasia in the east of France, was exiled to a monastery in 656, recalled in 675 and martyred by the tyrant Ebroin (679)
 Saint Egbert of Rathmelsigi Abbey (Ecgberht of Ripon), who organised the mission to Frisia (Neth.) (729) (see also April 24 - Latin calendar)
 Saint Frithbert, successor of St Acca as Bishop of Hexham, where he served for thirty-four years (766)
 Saint Mazota, leader of a group of nineteen holy virgins who went from Ireland to Scotland and founded a monastery at Abernethy on the Tay (8th century?)
 Saint Vintila, a monk who reposed as a hermit in Punxín in Galicia in Spain (890)

Post-Schism Orthodox saints
 Saint Theoctistus, Archbishop of Novgorod (1310)

New martyrs and confessors
 New Hieromartyrs John Piankov and Nicholas Yakhontov,  Priests (1918)
 New Hieromartyr Basil Spassky, Priest, at Tver (1938)
 New Hieromartyr Macarius (Mironov), Hieromonk of Zavidovskaya Gorka (Tver) (1938) 
 New Hieromartyr John (Smirnov), Hieromonk of Bolshoye Mikhailovskoye (Tver) (1938)
 New Hieromartyr Paul (Kratirov), Bishop of Starobelsk.

Other commemorations
 Commemoration of the consecration and re-dedication of the Holy and Great Church of Christ, the Hagia Sophia, by Patriarch Eutychius (562)
 Repose of Eldress Eudocia Rodionova of Leushino Monastery, Fool-for-Christ (1886)

Icon gallery

Notes

References

Sources
 December 23/January 5. Orthodox Calendar (PRAVOSLAVIE.RU).
 January 5 / December 23. HOLY TRINITY RUSSIAN ORTHODOX CHURCH (A parish of the Patriarchate of Moscow).
 December 23. OCA - The Lives of the Saints.
 The Autonomous Orthodox Metropolia of Western Europe and the Americas (ROCOR). St. Hilarion Calendar of Saints for the year of our Lord 2004. St. Hilarion Press (Austin, TX). p. 2.
 December 23. Latin Saints of the Orthodox Patriarchate of Rome.
 The Roman Martyrology. Transl. by the Archbishop of Baltimore. Last Edition, According to the Copy Printed at Rome in 1914. Revised Edition, with the Imprimatur of His Eminence Cardinal Gibbons. Baltimore: John Murphy Company, 1916.
Greek Sources
 Great Synaxaristes:  23 ΔΕΚΕΜΒΡΙΟΥ. ΜΕΓΑΣ ΣΥΝΑΞΑΡΙΣΤΗΣ.
  Συναξαριστής. 23 Δεκεμβρίου. ECCLESIA.GR. (H ΕΚΚΛΗΣΙΑ ΤΗΣ ΕΛΛΑΔΟΣ). 
Russian Sources
  5 января (23 декабря). Православная Энциклопедия под редакцией Патриарха Московского и всея Руси Кирилла (электронная версия). (Orthodox Encyclopedia - Pravenc.ru).
  23 декабря (ст.ст.) 5 января 2013 (нов. ст.). Русская Православная Церковь Отдел внешних церковных связей. (DECR).

December in the Eastern Orthodox calendar